St. Mary's Orthodox Church, originally known as Nativity of the Most Holy Mother of God Russian Orthodox Church, is a historic church of the American Carpatho-Russian Orthodox Diocese located at the intersection of West Park and Holland Avenues in Westover, Monongalia County, West Virginia.  It was also known as St. Michael the Archangel Church and St. Mary's Capatho-Russian Orthodox Greek Catholic Church.

The building itself was built in the 19th century and originally housed the Westover Methodist Church. It was later sold to the Orthodox Church, at which time it underwent significant alterations to bring it to the architectural standards necessary for an Orthodox house of worship. It was dedicated as an Orthodox church on September 8, 1923 (hence its dedication to the Nativity of the Virgin Mary, which feast day falls on that date).  It is a yellow brick building on a high foundation of textured concrete block.

It was listed on the National Register of Historic Places in 1988.

References

External links
  Church Home Page

Churches on the National Register of Historic Places in West Virginia
Eastern Orthodox churches in West Virginia
American Carpatho-Russian Orthodox Diocese
Churches completed in 1923
Buildings and structures in Monongalia County, West Virginia
Byzantine Revival architecture in West Virginia
Rusyn-American culture in West Virginia
National Register of Historic Places in Monongalia County, West Virginia